Ant Hill is a  summit located in Zion National Park, in Washington County of southwest Utah, United States. Precipitation runoff from this mountain drains into tributaries of the Virgin River. Despite its benign name, an ascent of this mountain is a dangerous and exposed climb.

Climate
Spring and fall are the most favorable seasons to visit Ant Hill. According to the Köppen climate classification system, it is located in a Cold semi-arid climate zone, which is defined by the coldest month having an average mean temperature below , and at least 50% of the total annual precipitation being received during the spring and summer.

See also
 List of mountains in Utah
 Geology of the Zion and Kolob canyons area
 Colorado Plateau

Gallery

References

External links

 Zion National Park National Park Service
 Weather forecast: National Weather Service
 Climbing Ant Hill: stavislost.com

Mountains of Utah
Zion National Park
Sandstone formations of the United States
Colorado Plateau
Mountains of Washington County, Utah
North American 2000 m summits